Veranus Alva Moore (April 13, 1859 – February 11, 1931) was a U.S. bacteriologist and pathologist. 

He was born in Hounsfield, New York. A Cornell University graduate and faculty member, Moore served as head of the United States Department of Agriculture's Division of Animal Pathology from 1895 to 1896. He also served as president of the Society of American Bacteriologists in 1910, and as dean of the Cornell University College of Veterinary Medicine from 1908 to 1929.

Personal life
Moore's parents were Alva and Antoinette.He married Mary Slawson in 1892.

References

1859 births
1931 deaths
American pathologists
Cornell University alumni
Cornell University faculty
People from Hounsfield, New York
Scientists from New York (state)